Valeriy Shevchuk (born August 20, 1939, in Zhytomyr) is a Ukrainian writer.

The most prominent books of the writer include “In the Midweek” (1967), “The Esplanade 12” (1968), “The Scream of the Rooster at Dawn” (1979), “On a Humble Field” (1982), “A House on a Mountain” (1983), “Three Leaves Behind the Window” (1986), “The Thinking Tree” (1986), “Birds from an Invisible Island” (1989), “The Murrain” (1989), “An Eternal Clock” (1990), “The Woman of Flowers” (1990 – the collection of fairy tales), “The path in the Grass. The Zhytomyr Saga” (two-volume, 1994), “Inside the Belly of an Apocalyptic Beast” (1995), “Eye of the Abyss” (1996), “The Snakewoman” (1998), “Silver Milk” (2002), “The Vanishing Shadows. A Family Chronicle.” (2002), “The Cossack State: Studies to the History of Establishment of the Ukrainian State” (1995), “The Roxelany Muse: the Ukrainian Literature of 16th to 18th Centuries in 2 Volumes” (2005), “The Known and the Unknown Sphinx. Hryhorii Skovoroda in the Modern View” (2008), etc.

He compiled and translated into modern literary language several collections of love poetry of the 16th to 19th centuries "Songs of Cupid" (1984) and of heroic poetry of the 9th and 10th centuries “Field of Mars” in 2 volumes (1989), “The Chronicle of Samiylo Velychko” (two-volume, 1991), etc.

Valeriy Shevchuk is a Honoured Professor of the Kyiv-Mohyla Academy and of the National University of Lviv. He is a laureate of Taras Shevchenko Prize, the Antonovych Foundation Award and of other numerous literary awards. He is as well a Honored Figure of Polish Culture. The works of the writer were translated into 22 languages.

Publications in English 
The Meek Shall Inherit... (trans. of Na poli smyrennomu). Trans. by Viktoriia Kholmohorova. Kyiv: Dnipro Publishers, 1989.

References

External links 
 Biography
 Valerii Shevchuk ″The meek shall inherit...″
 Valerii Shevchuk The Devil Who Is (The One Hundredth Witch) Translated by Olha Rudakevych
 Valerii Shevchuk A Few Minutes of Evening Translated by Uliana Pasicznyk 
 Valerii Shevchuk Skiing to Africa in a Single Day Translated by Uliana Pasicznyk
 Valeriy Shevchuk's Birds from an Invisible Island at ababahalamaha
 Valerii Shevchuk Eye of the Abyss (Chapters 1-13) Translated by Olha Rudakevych
 Valerii Shevchuk Eye of the Abyss (Chapters 14-24) Translated by Olha Rudakevych

1939 births
Writers from Zhytomyr
Living people
Ukrainian translators
Ukrainian literary historians
Taras Shevchenko National University of Kyiv alumni
Recipients of the Shevchenko National Prize
Recipients of the Order of Prince Yaroslav the Wise, 5th class